Four is a British independent film directed by John Langridge and released in 2011.

Plot
A jealous husband hires a movie-obsessed detective to kidnap his wife's lover and bring him to a derelict factory to administer some 'rough justice.' Once there, the husband discovers the detective has a revelation of his own. He has kidnapped the husband's wife as well.

Cast
 Martin Compston as Lover
 Craig Conway as Husband
 Kierston Wareing as Wife
 Sean Pertwee as Detective
 George Morris as Sergeant Walker

Reviews

Total Film's Paul Bradshaw wrote, "With just four actors, a single setting and more twists than a bag full of pretzels, John Langridge’s grimy lo-fi debut is almost smart, taut and nasty enough to bid for the Tarantino comparisons he’s obviously after." The Evening Standards Derek Malcolm found the film "over-ambitious", starting "as an offbeat thriller with pseudo-Pinterish dialogue" and ending up "much like a horror movie."

Writing in The Guardian Mark Kermode praised the film, acknowledging that "John Langridge's tortuously twisted warehouse-bound tale of a cuckolded husband seeking vengeance on his wife's lover does at least attempt to get the very most out of very little", while The Independent wrote that the script "meditates on male insecurity and possessiveness", but that "the attempt at menace unwisely borrows quotations from Hollywood movies, [a fact] that make [the movie] sound rather wannabe in consequence.”

Time Outs Tom Huddleston wrote that "the cast make the best" of a script that is "as uninspired as the plot, all muttered threats, cockernee slang and an initially amusing, increasingly wearying overuse of the F-word."

References

External links
 
 

2011 films
British thriller films
2010s English-language films
2010s British films